Maihar is a tehsil in Satna, Madhya Pradesh, India. Maihar is known for the temple of the revered mother goddess Sharda situated on Trikuta hill.

Origin of the name

It is said that when lord Shiva was carrying the body of the dead mother goddess (Mai in Hindi) Sati, her necklace (har in Hindi) fell at this place and hence the name "Maihar" (Maihar = Mai+Har, meaning the "necklace of mother").
there is also one fact about Maihar, that is related to famous Warriors Alha and his brother Udal.

According to the locals of Maihar, the warriors Alha and Udal,
regime under King Paramardideva Chandel who had war with Prithvi Raj Chauhan, were very strong followers of Sharda Devi. It is said that they are the first ones to visit the goddess in this remote forest. They called the mother goddess by the name "Sharda Mai", and henceforth she became popular as "Mata Sharda Mai". Alha worshiped for 12 years and got the amaratva with the blessings of Sharda Devi. Behind the temple and downhill is Alha Pond. At a distance of 2 km from this pond is situated an "akhara" (wrestling ring) where Alha and Udal used to practice kushti (wrestling). The people of Maihar believe that Alha is still alive and comes at 4:00 a.m. to worship the Goddess Sharda. This has been covered by various television news channels and broadcated on news

History
Maihar's history can be traced to the Paleolithic Age. The town was formerly the capital of the princely state of Maihar. The state was established in 1778 by Jogis clan, who were granted land by the ruler of the nearby state of Orchha.(Maihar king developed the other state Vijayraghavgarh). The state became a princely state of British India in the early 19th century, and was administered as part of Bundelkhand Agency in the Central India Agency. In 1871 the eastern states of Bundelkhand Agency, including Maihar, were separated to form the new agency of Bagelkhand in Central India. In 1933 Maihar, along with ten other states in western Bagelkhand, were transferred back to the Bundelkhand Agency. The title of the ruler is "Raja" and the present ruler is HH Raja Shrimant Saheb Akshay Raj Singh Ju deo Bahadur. The state, which was watered by the Tamsa River, consists mainly of alluvial soil covering sandstone, and is fertile except in the hilly district of the south. A large area was under forest, the produce of which provided a small export trade. The state suffered severely from famine in 1896–1897. Extensive ruins of shrines and other buildings surround the town. Maihar (constituency number 64) is one of the 7 Vidhan Sabha constituencies located in Satna district, it is the most politically motivated city of satna district with elections hugely dominated and contested by Hindu Brahmins and Patel community. Maihar is part of Satna Lok Sabha constituency along with six other Vidhan Sabha segments of this district, namely, Chitrakoot, Raigaon, Satna, Amarpatan, Nagod and Rampur-Baghelan Narayan Tripathi is the current MLA of Maihar Vidhan Sabha.

Tourist sites

Tourist attractions in Maihar include: Maa Sharda Devi Temple: Maihar is known for the Maa Sharda Devi temple (around of 502 A.D.), situated at the top of Trikut hill which is around 5 km from the railway station. There are 1,063 steps to reach the top of the hill. Along with stairs, there is a ropeway for convenience of the pilgrims developed government authorities.
 Ustad Allauddin Khan Maqbara: Padma Vibhushan "Sarod Samrat" Ustad Allauddin Khan chose the holy city of Maihar as his home and established the Maihar Gharana of music. He took his last breath here and buried as per his wish.Another Temples in Maihar
 Golamath Temple: This temple is dedicated to Lord Shiva. This east facing Pancharathi temple is built in Nagara style and has been built during Kalchuri period (10th – 11th century A.D.). It is said that this temple was built in one fortnight only.
 Oila Temple: Established by Neelkanth Maharaj, this temple is said to fulfil all the wishes of its pilgrims. This is situated in Satna Road.
 Badi Mai Temple: One of the oldest temples of the region, this temple is situated in Satna Road, Maihar.
 Bada Akhada: This temple is situated on Deviji Road, Maihar. The campus also has a Sanskrit School.
 Icchapurti Temple: Situated in the Campus of KJS Cement Factory at Rewa Road

Geography
It has an average elevation of 367 metres (1204 ft).The area receives moderate rainfall mostly in the month of July and August.

Demographics
<https://www.censusindia2011.com/madhya-pradesh/satna/maihar-population.html>
The Maihar city is divided into 18 wards for which elections are held every 5 years. The Maihar Municipality has population of 40,192 of which 21,031 are males while 19,161 are females as per report released by Census India 2011.

Population of Children with age of 0-6 is 5238 which is 13.03% of total population of Maihar (M). In Maihar Municipality, Female Sex Ratio is of 911 against state average of 931. Moreover, Child Sex Ratio in Maihar is around 875 compared to Madhya Pradesh state average of 918. Literacy rate of Maihar city is 81.99% higher than state average of 69.32%. In Maihar, Male literacy is around 87.82% while female literacy rate is 75.62%

Religion

Hinduism is the majority religion in maihar which is approx 81%

Islam is the second largest religion in maihar which is approx 17%

There are also some Jains which is approximately 0.23%

Education

Schools
Maharishi Vidya Mandir 
Santhome Senior Secondary School
Sarla Higher Secondary School at Sarlanagar, 
Gyan Vihar Vidyapeeth School at Satna Road 
 Simran Public higher secondary school
 Guru Nanak Mission Higher Secondary School
 Gurukul convent academy school udaipur, 
 Maa Sharda Devi Mandir Public School (MSDM) and 
 Miniland Academy are other developing schools.

Maihar has more than 35 Hindi and English medium schools.

1. Swami Vivekananda college
2. Sharda mahavidyalya Sarlanagar
Are the two major colleges of maihar

Transport

Maihar is placed quite well as far as connectivity is concerned. It is connected via both major rail routes and National Highway 7. The Mahakoshal Express provides a daily direct connection from Delhi's Hazrat Nizamuddin station. The Mahakoshal train (Train no. is 12189(Jbp to Delhi) and 12190(Delhi to Jbp))runs between Hazrat Nizamuddin station and Jabalpur station which is situated about  past Maihar. Maihar railway station is situated in between Katni and Satna stations of the West Central Railway. During the Nav Ratra festivals there is a heavy rush of pilgrims. Therefore, during these days all up and down trains stop at Maihar for the convenience of passengers. The nearest airports are Jabalpur and Khajuraho.

Pilgrims can reach the temple either by the stairs or rope-way. Rope-way facility is available for pilgrims and is a safe, convenient, fast and economic way of reaching the remotely located temple.

Economy
Maihar is developing as an industrial town of the state due to availability of limestone in the area. 
There is a 3.1 mn tn cement factory near Maihar (Maihar Cement Factory). The factory complex and the township are situated at Sarlanagar about 8 km away from Maihar town on the Maihar-Vijayraghavgarh Road. KJS Cement is also one of the major cement industry at Rewa Road. 
Reliance opened its first Cement Plant near Maihar in 2014, but due to its financial and industrial issues, M.P. Birla Group took it in 2016.
Majority of the population of Maihar is agricultural based and many rely on farming as their primary source of income.

Culture
Maihar has a prominent place in Indian classical music as the birthplace of the Maihar Gharana, a gharana (school or style) of Hindustani music. One of the doyen of Indian classical music, Ustad Allauddin Khan (died 1972) lived here for a long time and was the court musician of Maihar Raja's palace. His students popularised the style in the 20th century and some of his renowned disciples are Pandit Ravi Shankar and Nikhil Banerjee. The first Ustad Allauddin Khan music conference was held by Shri Deep Chand Jain in 1962. Every year, Maihar organizes a 2/3 days Cultural Event in the memory of Ustad Allauddin Khan in month of February.

References

External links

Cities and towns in Satna district
Satna
Religion in Madhya Pradesh